Tredegar House (Welsh: Tŷ Tredegar) is a 17th-century Charles II-era mansion on the southwestern edge of Newport, Wales. For over five hundred years it was home to the Morgan family, later Lords Tredegar; one of the most powerful and influential families in the area. Described as,  "the grandest and most exuberant country house in Monmouthshire" and one of the "outstanding houses of the Restoration period in the whole of Britain", the mansion stands in a reduced landscaped garden of  forming the non-residential part of Tredegar Park.  The property became a Grade I listed building on 3 March 1952 and has been under the care of the National Trust since March 2012. The park surrounding the house is designated Grade II* on the Cadw/ICOMOS Register of Parks and Gardens of Special Historic Interest in Wales.

Origin of the name
The name is first attested in the fourteenth century in the form Tredegyr. This may be explained as a compound of Welsh tre(f)  'a farmstead' and the personal name Tegyr (the same name is found in the Denbighshire name Botegyr < bod 'dwellng place, residence' + Tegyr). The name Tegyr itself may be derived from the Brittonic *Teco-rīx ('fair king').

The form Tredeger is found in the sixteenth century as are variants with -a- in the final syllable. Over time, the form Tredegar established itself as the usual spelling, as in the name of the Tredegar Iron Company of 1800. It was this that gave its name to the village and later town of Tredegar.

The current Welsh name of the house is 'Tŷ Tredegar', but this is somewhat unauthentic and is obviously a translation of 'Tredegar House'.

History 
The earliest surviving part of the building dates back to the late 15th century. The house was originally built of stone and had sufficient status to host Charles I. Between 1664 and 1672, however, William Morgan decided to rebuild the house on a larger scale from red brick, at that time a rare building material in Wales. The architect of the enlarged house is not known for certain, but Newman follows Howard Colvin's suggestion that the design was by Roger and William Hurlbutt, who had worked in a similar style at Ragley Hall and Warwick Castle. The architectural historian Peter Smith, writing in his work Houses of the Welsh Countryside, called Tredegar, "the most splendid brick house of the seventeenth century in Wales". In his 1882 publication, local historian Octavius Morgan provides a plan of an intricate garden maze which was in place prior to the 1660s improvements and which probably dated from the time of Queen Elizabeth I.

The Tredegar Morgans 1402–1951 

Tredegar's name came from Tredegar Fawr, the name of the mansion or seat of the old Morgans, who were descended from Cadifor the Great the son of Collwyn; and the owners of the land upon which Tredegar stands. The earliest record of someone with the name Morgan living at Tredegar is 1402: a Llewellyn Ap Morgan. Tredegar House, set in 90 acres which remains landscaped for ornamental purposes, with less agriculture than in previous centuries, is the finest Restoration house in Wales and for over five hundred years the estate (including Ruperra Castle) was home to the Morgan family, later Lords Tredegar; one of the most powerful and influential families in the area.

John Morgan was created a Knight of the Holy Sepulchre (possibly c.1448). Later, when Henry Tudor was crowned King Henry VII it was of great benefit to the Morgans of Tredegar who were great supporters of Henry. Sir John received reward for his early support, and on 7 November 1485 he was appointed by the new king to the office of ‘Sheriff of Wentloog and Newport’ and made ‘Steward’ of the Machen Commote. His elevation to officer of the Tudor crown placed Sir John Morgan's influence and power at a new height. Around 1490, he commissioned the building of a new house at Tredegar. A wing of Sir John's stone manor house still exists. It is now the oldest part of the present day Tredegar House.

A cadet branch of the ‘Tredegar Morgans’, probably nephews of Sir Thomas Morgan, included three brothers, Thomas, Robert and Edward. Thomas became Major-General Sir Thomas Morgan, 1st Baronet (1604–79), served in the Commonwealth forces during the English Civil War 1642–9, was made Governor of Gloucester in 1645, fought in Flanders, was wounded and in 1661 retired to his estate at Kinnersley, Herefordshire. Recalled in 1665 to become Governor of Jersey, he died at St Helier in April 1679. Married on 10 September 1632, he had nine sons, of whom the eldest, Sir John Morgan followed in his father's profession. Robert Morgan, (born circa 1615) became a farmer in Llanrumney, (Cardiff), not to be confused with Rhymney about 3 miles, from Tredegar, and was father of Henry Morgan (born in Llanrumney Hall, Cardiff, who would have a successful career in the Caribbean as a privateer, and pirate). Edward Morgan became Colonel Edward Morgan (born circa 1616 – Colonel after 1665), a Royalist during English Civil War 1642–49 and Captain General of the Kings forces in South Wales. They had six children, two sons and four daughters (including Anna Petronilla and Johanna). He was appointed Lieutenant Governor of Jamaica 1664–65.

During the civil war after the Battle of Naseby, King Charles I visited Tredegar House in 1645. In 1661 William Morgan (d.1680) rebuilt the house on a very grand scale, with the help of the huge dowry of his wife, Blanche Morgan. Their fortunes continued to flourish down the generations, tremendously enhanced by the foresight and business enterprises of Sir Charles Gould throughout the 18th century. Following his father's financial successes, his son further expanded several commercial and industrial projects, and virtually established Newport as an important trade centre. Whilst consolidating their influence on the political and economic issues of the country, they secured a baronetcy in 1792, and a Barony in 1859.

In 1854, Godfrey Morgan fought in, and survived, the Charge of the Light Brigade at Balaclava. Godfrey was 22 and Captain in the 17th Lancers. His steed, Sir Briggs, also survived and lived at Tredegar House until the horse's death at the age of 28. The horse was buried with full military honours in the Cedar Garden at Tredegar House. The monument still stands there today. In 1905 Godfrey was created the first Viscount Tredegar. He never married and on his death the estate passed to his nephew Courtenay Morgan. In 1920, the Tredegar Park Polo Club was founded at Tredegar House.

Later, extravagance, eccentricities, and weighty death duties seriously depleted the family's financial assets throughout the next three generations. John Morgan, 6th Baron Tredegar died childless in 1962 aged 54. His death signalled the end of the Morgans of Tredegar. In 1951, Tredegar House was stripped, the remaining contents were auctioned, and the estate was sold.

Ownership

For over five hundred years it was home to the Morgans, an influential Welsh family – later the Lords Tredegar – until they left in 1951.

After 1951 the house was bought by the Catholic Church as a convent school with boarders, later St. Joseph's Roman Catholic School. It was bought by the Newport Corporation Council in 1974, giving rise to its then status as "the grandest council house in Britain".

In December 2011 the National Trust signed an agreement with Newport City Council to take on the management of the building, as well as the 90 acres of gardens and parkland, on a 50-year lease from 2012. The Trust said that Tredegar House was of "great importance" as many similar properties had been lost in the past 100 years. The National Trust provide free-flow access to the house, but have closed parts of the upstairs to the public.

Filming and events

The House has been used as a filming location on several occasions. In 2014 an episode of the Antiques Roadshow was filmed at the property and the house's red brick exterior now features in the programme's opening sequence.

The television series Being Human, Da Vinci's Demons and The Hairy Bikers have all used the house as a location. Since the programme was revived in 2005, many episodes of Doctor Who have used Tredegar House for location filming, including the 2008 Christmas special "The Next Doctor" and the 2009/2010 Christmas/New Year special "The End of Time".

The House plays host to many events throughout the year, including an Easter Egg Hunt, Pirate's Day, August Bank Holiday 1930s Garden Party, Halloween and Christmas, which is themed around Charles Dickens's A Christmas Carol. There are also daily talks, activities and special tours for visitors.
An annual Folk Festival is held in May.

The House is approved for marriages and civil ceremonies and the Morgan Room may be hired for private functions.

For many years an annual vintage car rally was held in the grounds in order to raise funds for Leukaemia Research. The first rally was held in October 1980 and raised £635. The 34th and final rally was held in September 2014 and raised £80,000, bringing the total amount raised since 1980 to £868,000.

See also
 Ruperra Castle
 Evan Morgan, 2nd Viscount Tredegar
 Godfrey Morgan, 1st Viscount Tredegar
 Tredegar Square, London E3 
 Sir Charles Gould Morgan, 2nd Baron Tredegar

Notes

References

External links
Official site
Tredegar House – City of Newport site
Friends of Tredegar House
Doctor Who at Tredegar House
Tredegar House Folk Festival

Video: Katie Derham visits Tredegar House, for BBC Radio Three

Music venues in Newport, Wales
Newport, Wales
Culture in Newport, Wales
Grade I listed buildings in Newport, Wales
Registered historic parks and gardens in Newport
History of Newport, Wales
Houses in Newport, Wales
Landmarks in Newport, Wales
Museums in Newport, Wales
Country houses in Wales
Historic house museums in Wales
Grade I listed houses
1672 establishments in Wales